Edymar Martínez Blanco (born July 10, 1995, in Puerto La Cruz, Anzoátegui, Venezuela) is a Venezuelan model and beauty queen. She represented Anzoátegui state at Miss Venezuela 2014 and was crowned Miss Venezuela International by the outgoing title holder Michelle Bertolini. Martinez was crowned Miss International 2015 at Grand Prince Hotel Takanawa in Tokyo, Japan on November 5, 2015.

Personal life
Martinez is a young model began in modeling from a young age with the "Organization Intermodels Venezuela" in her native Puerto La Cruz. In December 2010, 15 years old, Edymar participated in the contest "Miss Teen Beauty Venezuela" representing the state where she was the winner, this being her first experience as regards beauty pageants. Edymar has covered campaigns for the magazine "Trends" and Biglidue.

Pageantry

Miss Venezuela 2014
Edymar represents the state Anzoátegui in the 62nd edition of the Miss Venezuela held on October 9 where she competed with 24 other candidates representing various states and regions of Venezuela. In this contest she won the special band "Miss Face" at the end of the evening she was proclaimed as Miss Venezuela International and represented her country  in Miss International 2015.  She won the pageant on 5 November 2015.  This was Venezuela's seventh Miss International crown.

Miss International 2015
Edymar represented Venezuela in the Miss International 2015 which was held on November 5 at Grand Prince Hotel Takanawa in Tokyo, Japan. She competed with more than seventy contestants from different countries and territories of the world, and at the end of the event, she was crowned Miss International 2015 by her predecessor Valerie Hernandez from Puerto Rico.

Reign as Miss International 2015
After her crowning, on November 6, 2015, she visited Osaka Prefecture for sponsor visit at the Panasonic Beauty Company with the finalists and some contestants.  On November 7, 2015, as Miss International 2015, Edymar with her runners-up visited Miss Paris Beauty School in Tokyo as Miss International Pageant Sponsor. After four days of being crowned as Miss International 2015, on November 9, 2015, Edymar visited Mie Prefecture to perform some activities with the finalists, including visited Mikimoto company, Prefecture Office in Mie Prefecture, Japan. On November 11, 2015, Edymar attended UDC13 Event.

Edymar traveled to across Japan for sponsor visit. On November 17, 2015, Martinez traveled to Venezuela for her homecoming, her arrival to Venezuela was transmitted by Venezuelan television and she had a press conference in Caracas. On November 18, 2015, Martinez was at Portada's, a Venezuelan TV program. On November 20, 2015, she was interviewed by Noticiero Venevision. She had a homage in Super Sabado Sensacional during five hour special on Venevisión (Venezuela's main TV network) and  she received the traditional Venezuelan kokeshi (Japanese doll), a tradition from 1985 when Venezuela won the first title of Miss International to the present day.

On February 19, 2016, Edymar attended the official final Puteri Indonesia 2016 in Jakarta. Formerly, the crowned Miss Universe attends the event, and this the first time that Puteri Indonesia Pageant invited Miss International to their coronation event.

Edymar has traveled to across Japan for sponsor visit, and Indonesia. In April, 2016 she won the title Timeless Beauty 2015 and appeared in the magazine Hola! Venezuela.

On June 24, 2016, Edymar traveled to Bolivia as guest of luxury to attend the coronation of the new Miss Bolivia and her court of winners with another grand slam winner Stephania Stegman, Miss Supranational 2015.

During her reign as Miss International, she has traveled to Bolivia, Indonesia, Panama, numerous trips around in Japan, and her home country of Venezuela.

See also 
First part of homage: https://www.youtube.com/watch?v=F2zxVDekXAk
https://www.youtube.com/watch?v=8RezFFncRCo

References

External links 
Official Miss International website

1995 births
Living people
Venezuelan beauty pageant winners
Miss International winners
Miss International 2015 delegates
People from Puerto la Cruz